The Democratic Union ( Demokratyčnyj Sojuz) is a political party in Ukraine registered in June 1999.
 
At the parliamentary elections on 30 March 2002, the party won together with the Democratic Party of Ukraine 0.87%% of the popular vote and 4 (single-mandate constituency) seats out of 450 seats. The party did not take part in further national elections.

See also
Liberalism
Contributions to liberal theory
Liberalism worldwide
List of liberal parties
Liberal democracy
Liberalism in Ukraine

References

Liberal parties in Ukraine